The Musée des Collections Historiques de la Préfecture de Police, also known as the Musée de la Préfecture de Police, is a museum of police history in the 5th arrondissement of Paris, France. 
It is located in the Hôtel de police at 4, rue de la Montagne-Sainte-Geneviève. The museum is open daily except Sunday; admission is free.

The museum was originally started by prefect Louis Lépine (1846-1933) for the Exposition Universelle (1900), and has gradually grown through subsequent years. It now contains evidence, photographs, letters, memorabilia, and drawings that reflect major events in the history of France (including conspiracies and arrests), famous criminal cases and characters, prisons, and daily life in the capital such as traffic and hygiene. Exhibits include a guillotine, uniforms, the pistol used in the assassination of Paul Doumer, and relics of the World War II occupation including German machine guns and insignias worn by Jews.

See also 
 List of museums in Paris

References 
 Musée de la Préfecture de Police 
 ParisInfo entry
 Paris.org entry
 Fodors article
 Gralon description (French)

Museums in Paris
Law enforcement museums in France
Buildings and structures in the 5th arrondissement of Paris